Edara Aryan Rajesh is an Indian actor & film producer who appears in Telugu films. He is the son of Telugu veteran director and producer E. V. V. Satyanarayana. He has played the lead role in 14 Telugu films, and now takes up a variety of roles in both films and web series'.

He produces films along with his younger brother Allari Naresh under their production company, E. V .V. Cinema.

Personal life 
Aryan Rajesh was born to Telugu veteran director and producer E V V Satyanarayana and Saraswati. He has a younger brother Allari Naresh who is also an actor in Telugu cinema. On 14 February 2012, he married Subhashini, daughter of contractor Kantipudi Amarnath and has one son & daughter.

Career
His career started with the movie Hai in 2002 which was directed by his father E. V. V. Satyanarayana. The same year he debuted in Tamil in Vasanthabalan's directorial debut Album, alongside Shrutika. Rajesh acted in Leela Mahal Center (2004) and  his father's Evadi Gola Vaadidhi (2005); both were successful. He acted with his brother Allari Naresh in Nuvvante Naakishtam (2005), which was also directed by his father. Rajesh acted in the thriller film Anumanaspadam (2007), which received positive reviews.  After that he was seen in Cheran's Pokkisham (2009) in a small role. In 2014, he returned to Tamil with a film titled Eera Veyyil. He became producer with his brother's Bandipotu (2015). He played a small role in Vinaya Vidheya Rama (2019).

Filmography

Films 
As actor

As producer
Bandipotu (2015)

Web series

References

External links
 

Living people
Telugu male actors
Indian male film actors
Male actors in Telugu cinema
Male actors in Tamil cinema
Year of birth missing (living people)